Sobrače (in older sources also Subrače) is a village in the upper valley of the Temenica River in the Municipality of Ivančna Gorica in central Slovenia. The area is part of the historical region of Lower Carniola. The municipality is now included in the Central Slovenia Statistical Region. 

The local church is dedicated to Saint Andrew and belongs to the Parish of Šentvid pri Stični. It dates to the 17th century.

References

External links
Sobrače on Geopedia

Populated places in the Municipality of Ivančna Gorica